Maximilian Ullmann (born 17 June 1996) is an Austrian professional footballer who plays as a left-back for 2. Bundesliga club 1. FC Magdeburg, on loan from Venezia. He represents the Austria national team.

Club career
On 18 January 2022, Ullmann signed a contract with Italian club Venezia until the end of the 2023–24 season.

In January 2023 he joined 2. Bundesliga club 1. FC Magdeburg on loan.

Career statistics

Club

International

References

External links
 
 Profile at oefb.at
 

1996 births
Living people
Austrian footballers
Association football fullbacks
Austria youth international footballers
Austria under-21 international footballers
Austrian Football Bundesliga players
2. Liga (Austria) players
Austrian Regionalliga players
Serie A players
LASK players
FC Juniors OÖ players
SK Rapid Wien players
Venezia F.C. players
1. FC Magdeburg players
Austrian expatriate footballers
Austrian expatriate sportspeople in Italy
Expatriate footballers in Italy
Austrian expatriate sportspeople in Germany
Expatriate footballers in Germany